Benefits Supervisor Sleeping is a 1995 oil on canvas painting by Lucian Freud depicting an obese, naked woman lying on a couch. Tilley is the author of a biography of the Australian performer Leigh Bowery titled Leigh Bowery, The Life and Times of an Icon. Tilley was introduced to Freud by Bowery, who was already modelling for him. Freud painted a number of large portraits of her around the period 1994–96, and came to call her "Big Sue". He said of her body "It's flesh without muscle and it has developed a different kind of texture through bearing such a weight-bearing thing".

The painting held the world record for the highest price paid for a painting by a living artist when it was sold by Guy Naggar for US$33.6 million (£17.2 million) at Christie's in New York City in May 2008 to Roman Abramovich. 

Freud's painting The Brigadier was sold for £35.8million ($56.2million) in 2015, four years after his death, replacing Benefits Supervisor Sleeping as the most expensive Freud painting sold at auction.

The painting was exhibited twice at Flowers Gallery:
1996: Naked – Flowers East at London Fields 
1997: British Figurative Art - Part 1: Painting at Flowers East

References

External links
 Lot Details on Christies.com

Paintings by Lucian Freud
Nude art
1995 paintings
Portraits of women